James Miller Tunnell (August 2, 1879 – November 14, 1957) was an American lawyer and politician from Georgetown, in Sussex County, Delaware. He was a member of the Democratic Party, and served as U.S. Senator from Delaware.

Early life and family
Tunnell was born in Clarksville, near Millville, Delaware. He attended the public schools and graduated in 1900 from Franklin College, now combined with Muskingum College at New Concord, Ohio.

Professional and political career
Tunnell taught in the public schools, eventually becoming principal of the schools at Frankford, Selbyville and Ocean View, Delaware. Meanwhile, he studied the law, was admitted to the bar in 1907 and began a practice in Georgetown, Delaware. He was president of the Georgetown Board of Education from 1919 until 1932. Tunnell was also a banker and owned and operated a number of farms in Sussex County, Delaware.

Tunnell first ran for a seat in the United States Senate in 1924, but was defeated by Republican T. Coleman du Pont, a former senator. He was elected to the United States Senate in 1940, this time defeating the incumbent Republican Senator John G. Townsend, Jr. During this term, he served with the Democratic majority in the 77th, 78th, and 79th Congresses. He was chairman of the Committee on Pensions in the 78th and 79th Congresses. Tunnell lost his bid for a second term in 1946 to Republican John J. Williams from Millsboro, Delaware. He served from January 3, 1941, to January 3, 1947, during the administrations of U.S. presidents Franklin D. Roosevelt and Harry S. Truman.

Death and legacy
James M. Tunnell died age 78 on November 14, 1957, in Philadelphia, Pennsylvania.  He is buried in the Blackwater Church Cemetery, near Clarksville, Sussex County, Delaware. His son James M. Tunnell Jr. was the Democratic nominee for the Class 2 Senate seat in 1966, but lost to incumbent J. Caleb Boggs.

Almanac
Elections are held the first Tuesday after November 1. U.S. Senators are popularly elected and take office January 3 for a six-year term.

References

External links
Biographical Directory of the United States Congress 
Delaware’s Members of Congress

The Political Graveyard 

 

 

1879 births
1957 deaths
People from Georgetown, Delaware
Muskingum University alumni
American educators
Delaware lawyers
Delaware Democrats
Democratic Party United States senators from Delaware
Burials in Sussex County, Delaware
People from Sussex County, Delaware
American bankers